Julia Rommel is an American painter. Her work is in the collections of the Museum of Modern Art and the Whitney Museum.

Exhibitions 

 Two Italians, Six Lifeguards. The Aldrich Contemporary Art Museum, Ridgefield, Connecticut, November 2015 – April 2016 (curated by Amy Smith-Stewart)''

Collections 

Among the museums holding her work are: the Albright-Knox Art Gallery in Buffalo; the Hammer Museum in Los Angeles; the Museum of Modern Art in New York City; the San Francisco Museum of Modern Art; the Whitney Museum of American Art in New York City; and the Walker Art Center in Minneapolis.

References

1980 births
Living people
21st-century American painters
21st-century American women artists
American women painters
American abstract artists
Abstract painters
American contemporary painters
American University alumni
Painters from New York (state)